The  was a Japanese night fighter, intended to replace the Nakajima J1N1-S Gekkou (Allied code name Irving). Like the Gekkou, it was to be equipped with radar to counter the B-29 air raids over Japan. Development time for the S1A increased while trying to overcome design shortcomings, such as the insufficient power of the Navy's requested Nakajima Homare engines, resulting in no aircraft being completed before the war ended.

Design and development
The Denko'''s service weight exceeded ten thousand kilograms because the aircraft was full of special equipment including oxygen injection, but the turbocharger's remote location from the engine caused many problems. Because the initial prototypes' engines did not pass Navy standards only two aircraft were ever manufactured. Two more had been planned before cancellation that would have used the more powerful Mitsubishi HI MK9A Ru or MK10A Ru engines.

Additionally, the Tōnankai earthquake occurred in December 1944 with the aircraft factories and prototypes badly damaged as a result. On 9 June 1945 the airstrikes on Aichi Kokuki and Aichi Tokei Denki Seizo Co., Ltd blew up the S1A first prototype and forced movement of the second to the Gifu large Sadakazu factory to be assembled, but on 9 July another airstrike destroyed the second prototype. To date the Aichi S1A is still the most massive fighter developed in Japan's naval history.

Specifications (S1A1 Denko)

See also

References
Notes

Bibliography

 Francillon, Ph.D., René J. Japanese Aircraft of the Pacific War''. London: Putnam & Company Ltd., 1979. .

External links
 
 

S1A
Abandoned military aircraft projects of Japan
World War II Japanese fighter aircraft